Mangelia stosiciana is a species of sea snail, a marine gastropod mollusk in the family Mangeliidae.

Description
The length of the shell attains 6 mm.

The color of the shell is whitish to yellowish-brown. The whorls are round-shouldered above. The rude ribs show wider interspaces and are crossed by elevated revolving lines, some of them much larger than the rest, and which are sometimes brown.

Distribution
This species occurs in the Mediterranean Sea and off the Canary Islands.

References

 Gofas, S.; Le Renard, J.; Bouchet, P. (2001). Mollusca, in: Costello, M.J. et al. (Ed.) (2001). European register of marine species: a check-list of the marine species in Europe and a bibliography of guides to their identification. Collection Patrimoines Naturels, 50: pp. 180–213

External links
  Tucker, J.K. 2004 Catalog of recent and fossil turrids (Mollusca: Gastropoda). Zootaxa 682:1–1295.
 
 MNHN, Paris: Mangelia stosiciana

stosiciana
Gastropods described in 1869